Carmita Martin also known as Carmi Martin (born August 9, 1963) is a Filipina actress, model, and comedian.

Career
She first appeared in Dolphy's Angels with Liz Alindogan, Anna Marie Gutierrez, Yehlen Catral and the late comedy king Dolphy. She did more movies with Dolphy such as Stariray, The Quick Brown Fox, John en Marsha, Dancing Master, Dino Dinero and Father & Son. Her last movie with Dolphy was Dobol Trobol (2008) with Vic Sotto in 2008.
She became a mainstay of Chicks to Chicks in 1980 in IBC-13 until its transfer to ABS-CBN 2 in 1986. She also did "Abangan ang Sususnod na Kabanata". With these sitcoms, she was able to hone her flair for comedy. She had a weekly drama anthology entitled "Carmi" over BBC-2 directed by Soxy Topacio from 1985-86 where she portrayed various characters, and acted with thespians. She also had a variety show with Roderick Pualate on Channel 2 (1986-87) with "Tonight with Dick and Carmi". One film that showed her acting prowess was "Hot Property" directed by National Artist Lino Brocka as entry to the 1983 Metro Manila Film Festival.

Despite being able to do drama like Cain at Abel (1982); Laruan (1983); Bayan ko: Kapit ds Patalinm (1985); Bagong Hari (1986); Carmi excels prominently in comedy -- the funny other woman in Andres de Saya (1982); the tactless office employee in Working Girls (1984); the disorganized but demanding woman in Sa Totoo Lang (1985); the sexy PE teacher in "Ma'am may We Go Out" (1985); the wacky stepmom in "When I Fall in Love" (1986).

Personal life
She took a two-year certificate course at the Philippine School of Interior Design in 2003. And she graduated Fine Arts at The Philippine Women's University on April 2, 2011.

Filmography

Television

Film

References

External links

 Carmi Martin Biography at PinoyStop

Living people
Filipino child actresses
Filipino film actresses
Filipino television actresses
That's Entertainment (Philippine TV series)
That's Entertainment Tuesday Group Members
Filipino women comedians
People from Dumaguete
Actresses from Negros Oriental
1963 births
ABS-CBN personalities
GMA Network personalities
Philippine Women's University alumni
20th-century comedians
21st-century comedians
20th-century Filipino actresses
21st-century Filipino actresses